Route 315 is a  local highway in northwestern New Brunswick, Canada. The road runs from New Brunswick Route 180 in Bathurst to its northern terminus at New Brunswick Route 134 in Petit-Rocher, its route running mostly parallel to the west with New Brunswick Route 11.

Communities along Route 315
 Bathurst
 Dunlop
 Nigadoo
 LaPlante
 Petit-Rocher

See also
List of New Brunswick provincial highways

References

315
315
Transport in Bathurst, New Brunswick